Timmy Andreas Pettersson (born March 15, 1977 in Gislaved, Sweden) is a professional Swedish ice hockey player. He is currently a defenseman serving as team captain for Djurgårdens IF Hockey in Hockeyallsvenskan.

References

External links 

1977 births
Djurgårdens IF Hockey players
Frölunda HC players
HV71 players
Södertälje SK players
Living people
Swedish ice hockey defencemen